Chah Zal (also Romanized as Chāh Zāl) is a village in Seyfabad Rural District, in the Central District of Khonj County, Fars Province, Iran. At the 2006 census, its population was 36, in 7 families.

References 

Populated places in Khonj County